
Emmotland is a small hamlet in the East Riding of Yorkshire, England. It forms part of the civil parish of North Frodingham.

The hamlet consists of two farms at the end of a small access road. West Beck joins the Driffield Navigation at Emmotland.

History 
When the Driffield Navigation was built, a towpath bridge was placed over the West Beck near the junction. This bridge disappeared before 1980.

One of the last acts of the Humberside County Council was to build a new footpath bridge over the West Beck. The bridge is a fixed structure, but has a high headroom. A mistake in the location of the bridge means that it lands on private property, and is dangerously close to the river. Since no further money is available the bridge has remained closed since its construction.

In 1823 Emmotland was in the parish of Frodingham and the Wapentake and Liberty of Holderness. Occupations at the time included two farmers.

Location 

Position of Emmotland on the Driffield Navigation 
Next place upstream = Fisholme
Next place downstream = Bethells Bridge
Next place upstream on West Beck = Corpslanding

References

Villages in the East Riding of Yorkshire
Holderness